Minuscule 623 (in the Gregory-Aland numbering), α 173 (von Soden), is a Greek diglot minuscule manuscript of the New Testament, on parchment. It is dated by a colophon to the year 1037. The manuscript is lacunose. Tischendorf labeled it by 156a and 190p.

Description 

The codex contains the text of the Acts of the Apostles, Catholic epistles, Pauline epistles on 187 parchment leaves (size ) with one lacuna (Acts 1:1-5:4). The text is written in two columns per page, 43-44 lines per page.

The Pauline epistles have a commentary.

The order of books: Book of Acts, Catholic epistles, and Pauline epistles. On the list of the Pauline epistles, the Hebrews is placed before First Epistle to Timothy.

Text 

The Greek text of the codex Aland placed it in Category III.

Ending of the Epistle to the Romans has omitted verse 16:24 (as in codices Codex Sinaiticus A B C 5 81 263 1739 1838 1962 2127 itz vgww copsa,bo ethro Origenlat).

In 1 Corinthians 3:3 it reads ἔρις διχοστασία for ἔρις καί διχοστασίαι (p46, D, 33, 88, 104, 181, 326, 330, 436, 451, 614, 629, 1241). Other manuscripts have reading ἔρις (𝔓11, א, B, C, P, Ψ, 81, 181, 630, 1739, 1877, 1881, it, vg).

History 

The manuscript was written in the city Reggio for the wish of Nicolas Archbishop of Calabria by the cleric Theodore from Sicily. Formerly it was held in Grottaferrata.

The manuscript was examined by Zacagni, Johann Jakob Wettstein, Johann Jakob Griesbach, and Johann Martin Augustin Scholz. It was added to the list of New Testament manuscripts by Scholz. C. R. Gregory saw the manuscript in 1886.

Formerly, it was labeled by 156a and 190p. In 1908 Gregory gave the number 623 to it.

The manuscript is currently housed at the Vatican Library (Vat. gr. 1650), at Rome.

See also 

 List of New Testament minuscules
 Biblical manuscript
 Textual criticism

References

Further reading 
 Johann Martin Augustin Scholz, Biblisch-kritische Reise in Frankreich, der Schweiz, Italien, Palästine und im Archipel in den Jahren 1818, 1819, 1820, 1821: Nebst einer Geschichte des Textes des Neuen Testaments (Leipzig, 1823), pp. 99–100.
 Kirsopp Lake  & Silva Lake, Dated  Greek Minuscule Manuscripts to the Year 1200,  Boston VII, 283.
 Bruce M. Metzger, Manuscripts of the Greek Bible (Oxford and New York, 1981), p. 35.

External links 
 Minuscule 623 (GA) at the Encyclopedia of Textual Criticism

Greek New Testament minuscules
11th-century biblical manuscripts
Manuscripts of the Vatican Library